Chaadayevo is a rural locality (a selo) in Borisoglebskoye Rural Settlement, Muromsky District, Vladimir Oblast, Russia. The population was 972 as of 2010. There are 14 streets.

Geography 
Chaadayevo is located 13 km north of Murom (the district's administrative centre) by road. Borisovo is the nearest rural locality.

References 

Rural localities in Muromsky District
Muromsky Uyezd